The following is a comparative list of smartphones belonging to the Google Nexus line of devices, using the Android operating system.

See also
 Comparison of Google Pixel smartphones
 Comparison of Google Nexus tablets
 Comparison of Samsung Galaxy S smartphones
 Comparison of smartphones
 List of Google Play edition devices
 Pixel (smartphone)

References 

Nexus smartphones, Comparison of
Google Nexus
Lists of mobile phones
Computing comparisons